Hes Games is a 1984 sports game released for the Commodore 64 by HESware.

It was originally developed by 3-2-1 Software for the C64 .  It was later upgraded by Michael Crick and released in the UK by Americana as Go For The Gold (#1 hit September 1986) and in the US by COSMI CORP under the label Celery Software. The US title, World Games, was changed to  Gold Medal Games  to avoid confusion with an Epyx product also called World Games.

Reception 
InfoWorld in 1984 stated that HES Games "may be one of the best" of several Olympics-related games, especially praising the weightlifting simulation. The game was positively reviewed by Zzap!64 magazine who gave it a 95% rating.

References

External links
Review in GAMES Magazine

1984 video games
Commodore 64 games
Commodore 64-only games
Summer Olympic video games
Video games developed in the United States
Single-player video games